Mount Analogue is a prominent mountain along the Watson Escarpment in Antarctica, rising to  and forming the highest point of the ridge that runs north from Phleger Dome on the Stanford Plateau. The feature was visited in 1977–1978 by a United States Antarctic Research Program (USARP)-Arizona State University geological party, led by Edmund Stump, and named after Mount Analogue, a mythical mountain described in the unfinished novel of the same name by French writer René Daumal. Like its literary counterpart, the mountain was obscured by clouds during much of the visit by the USARP party.

Analogue, Mount